Howard Scruton (born October 6, 1962) is a Canadian former professional ice hockey player that played 4 games for the Los Angeles Kings in the National Hockey League during the 1982–83 season. As a youth, he played in the 1975 Quebec International Pee-Wee Hockey Tournament with a minor ice hockey team from Toronto.

Career statistics

Regular season and playoffs

References

External links
 

1962 births
Living people
Canadian ice hockey defencemen
Ice hockey people from Toronto
Kingston Canadians players
Los Angeles Kings players
New Haven Nighthawks players
Niagara Falls Flyers players
St. Michael's Buzzers players
Undrafted National Hockey League players